Malcolm Benjamin Graham Christopher Williamson,  (21 November 19312 March 2003) was an Australian composer.  He was the Master of the Queen's Music from 1975 until his death.

Biography
Williamson was born in Sydney in 1931; his father was an Anglican priest, Rev. George Williamson. He studied composition and horn at the Sydney Conservatorium of Music. His teachers included Eugene Goossens. In 1950 he moved to London where he worked as an organist, a proofreader, and a nightclub pianist. In 1952 he converted to Roman Catholicism. From 1953 he studied with Elisabeth Lutyens and Erwin Stein. His first major success was with his Piano Concerto No. 1, premiered by Clive Lythgoe at the 1958 Cheltenham Festival to a standing ovation. Williamson was a prolific composer at this time, receiving many commissions and often performing his own works, both on organ and piano.

In 1975, the death of Arthur Bliss left the title of Master of the Queen's Music vacant. The selection of Williamson to fill this post was a surprise, over other composers such as Benjamin Britten (whose compositional inactivity and terminal illness were not then publicly known), Michael Tippett and Malcolm Arnold, such that William Walton had remarked that "the wrong Malcolm" had been chosen. In addition, Williamson was the first non-Briton to hold the post. He wrote a number of pieces connected to his royal post, including Mass of Christ the King (1978) (see below) and Lament in Memory of Lord Mountbatten of Burma (1980). However, controversy attended his tenure, notably his failure to complete the intended "Jubilee Symphony" for the Silver Jubilee of Queen Elizabeth II in 1977. He became less prolific in "Royal" works during the last twenty years or so of his life, although he never completely ceased to take interest in writing music for the Royal Family (see list of Royal works below). His overall compositional output slowed considerably due to a series of illnesses. He died in 2003 in a hospital in Cambridge. He was widely reported to have been an alcoholic.

Williamson married an American, Dolores "Dolly" Daniel, in 1960 and they had one son and two daughters.

Williamson had a number of relationships with both sexes, both before and after his marriage. After his marriage broke down in the 1970s, “a deep relationship with musician and publisher Simon Campion helped sustain him through the inevitably stormy periods, both in Australia and in England, that characterised the final stages of his career.”

He had a series of strokes that left him needing a wheelchair, and he spent his final months in hospital. His funeral was not attended by any representatives of the Royal Family.

Honours
Williamson was appointed a Commander of the Order of the British Empire (CBE) in 1976, and an honorary Officer of the Order of Australia (AO) in 1987.  Honorary awards of the Order of Australia are made only to people who are not citizens of Australia.  It is not clear why Williamson did not qualify for a substantive award, as there appears to be nothing on the public record to suggest he ever relinquished his Australian citizenship.  The citation for the award read "For service to music and the mentally handicapped". He was the first Master of the Queen's Music in over a century not to be knighted.

Williamson's music
Some of Williamson's early works use the twelve-tone technique of Arnold Schoenberg, but his greatest influence is often said to be Olivier Messiaen. He discovered Messiaen's music shortly before converting to Roman Catholicism in 1952. He was also influenced by Benjamin Britten, as well as by jazz and popular music (this latter influence may have come in part from him working as a night club pianist in the 1950s).

Williamson wrote seven symphonies; four numbered piano concertos (plus the Concerto for Two Pianos and Strings, the Concerto for Two Pianos and Wind Quintet, after Alan Rawsthorne, and the Sinfonia Concertante), concertos for violin, organ, harp and saxophone; and many other orchestral works. He wrote ballets, including Sun into Darkness and The Display, many effective choral works, chamber music, music for solo piano, and music for film and television including the prologue and main title of Watership Down. His operas include English Eccentrics, to a libretto by Edith Sitwell; Our Man in Havana, after the novel by Graham Greene; The Violins of Saint-Jacques, from Patrick Leigh Fermor's novel; and two adaptations of plays by August Strindberg, Lucky Peter's Journey after , and The Growing Castle after A Dream Play. Williamson's music for children includes the operas The Happy Prince (based on the story by Oscar Wilde) and Julius Caesar Jones as well as cassations, which are short operas with audience participation. The cassation The Valley and the Hill was written for the Silver Jubilee of Queen Elizabeth II in 1977 and performed by 18,000 children.

The composer's largest choral work, his Mass of Christ the King, was commissioned by the Three Choirs Festival, also for the 1977 jubilee. It attracted attention partly because Williamson delivered it late. Scored for two sopranos, tenor, baritone; soprano, alto, tenor, bass (henceforth SATB) chorus; SATB echo choir; and large orchestra, the work received several performances over a few years, including a live BBC broadcast in 1981, but has more recently been overlooked. A recording of a performance at the Perth Festival 1981 can be found on YouTube.

Williamson became generally much less prolific in later life, although he had some very busy years.  For example, in 1988 Williamson wrote a large-scale choral-orchestral work The True Endeavour, the orchestral Bicentennial Anthem, the Fanfare of Homage for military band, a ballet Have Steps Will Travel for John Alleyne and the National Ballet of Canada, Ceremony for Oodgeroo (Oodgeroo Noonuccal, formerly known as Kath Walker) for brass quintet, and also commenced work on a substantial new choral-symphony The Dawn is at Hand (to texts by Kath Walker), completed and performed in Australia the following year.  Other works include the Requiem for a Tribe Brother (another Australian work, completed in 1992), a third string quartet (1993), a fourth piano concerto (1994, for Marguerite Wolff) and a symphony for solo harp, Day That I Have Loved (1994). The orchestral song cycle on texts by Iris Murdoch, A Year of Birds, premiered at The Proms in 1995. The same year also saw the premiere of an orchestral work With Proud Thanksgiving, commissioned for the fiftieth anniversary of the United Nations, and dedicated to the memory of Williamson's long-time friend, the UK Prime Minister Harold Wilson.

At the funeral of Queen Elizabeth II, held on Monday, September 19, 2022, mourners filed into Westminster Abbey to
‘O Paradise’ by Williamson.

Selected compositions

Royal works
The Valley and the Hill (1977), children's pageant
Symphony No. 4 – Jubilee (1977), for orchestra. The work (which has never been performed) has three movements:
 "The Birth of the World" (Largo)
 "Eagle" (Allegro vivo)
 "The Prayer of the Waters" (Lento)
Jubilee Hymn (1977), for unison choir, SATB choir and orchestra
The House of Windsor (1977), score for the TV series (an orchestral suite was extracted in the same year)
Mass of Christ the King (1977–1978), for lyric soprano, dramatic soprano, tenor and baritone soli, SATB choir, SATB echo choir and orchestra
Lament in Memory of Lord Mountbatten of Burma (1980), for violin solo and string orchestra; premiered by Leonard Friedman (violin) and the Scottish Baroque Ensemble on 5 May 1980
Ode for Queen Elizabeth (1980), for string orchestra; non-public premiere by the Scottish Baroque Ensemble at Holyrood Palace on 3 July 1980, in the presence of the royal family; public premiere by the same ensemble on 25 August 1980 at Hopetoun House in Edinburgh. The work is divided into five sections:
 "Act of Homage"
 "Alleluia"
 "Ecossaise"
 "Majesty in Beauty"
 "Scottish Dance"
Richmond Fanfare (1980), for five trumpets, two tenor trombones, two bass trombones, tuba, percussion and organ
Now Is the Singing Day (1981), for soloists, SATB choir, two pianos, percussion and string orchestra
Mass of St. Margaret of Scotland (1982), for unison choir and piano, or SATB choir and organ
Songs for a Royal Baby (1985), for SATB soli/choir and string orchestra

Australian works
Although Williamson lived in Britain for most of his life, he travelled widely and maintained a deep affection for his native country. He wrote many works specifically for or about Australia, and frequently set texts by Australian poets, such as James McAuley and Kath Walker. Williamson was also inspired to respond through music to political issues, such as Aboriginal rights (a matter close to his heart). Below is a select list of works with a specifically Australian connection.

Symphony No. 1 "Elevamini" (1957), for orchestra; public premiere given by Melbourne Symphony Orchestra, in November 1963
Piano Concerto No. 2 (1960), for piano and string orchestra; written for a competition at the University of Western Australia, Perth. Premiered on 3 May 1962 by soloist Michael Brimer and the University String Orchestra, conducted by Frank Callaway. The concerto is divided into three movements, with the second running attacca into the third:
 Allegro con brio
 Andante lento (with cadenza)
 Allegro con spirito – Più mosso
Travel Diaries – Sydney (1961), for piano solo; a book of relatively easy piano pieces intended for teaching purposes. Sydney Diaries is one of five such books, with the others concerning London, Naples, Paris and New York. Sydney Diaries has thirteen movements:
 "North Head"
 "Pyrmont Dock"
 "Harbour Bridge"
 "Botanical Gardens"
 "At Central Railway"
 "Harbour Ferry"
 "Lane Cove"
 "King's Cross"
 "A Morning Swim"
 "Kirribilli"
 "The Southern Cross"
 "In Hyde Park"
 "South Head"
Symphony for Voices (1962), for a cappella SATB choir; an elaborate five-movement work, setting texts by the Australian poet James McAuley.
 Invocation (for unnaccompanied contralto)
 Terra Australis
 Jesus
 Envoi
 New Guinea
Piano Concerto No. 3 (1962), for piano and orchestra; commissioned by the Australian Broadcasting Commission (ABC). Premiered by John Ogdon (to whom the work is dedicated) and the Sydney Symphony Orchestra conducted by Joseph Post, June 1964.
I Will Lift Mine Eyes (1970), for unison choir, echo choir and organ; premiered on 3 May 1970 in Sydney
Concerto for Two Pianos and String Orchestra (1972), subtitled Double Concerto; premiered by Charles Webb and Wallace Hornibrook (pianos), with the Astra Chamber Orchestra, conducted G. L. Smith in Melbourne in 1972:
 Allegro ma non-troppo
 Lento
 Allegro vivo
The Musicians of Bremen (1972), based on the Brothers Grimm fairy tale, the "Town Musicians of Bremen", for two countertenors, tenor, two baritones and bass voices; premiered by The King's Singers in Sydney on 15 May 1972
Adelaide Fanfare (1973), for two trumpets, two horns, 2 trombones, tuba and organ
Canberra Fanfare (1973), for two trumpets, two trombones and percussion
The Glitter Gang (1974), cassation for audience, choir and orchestra; commissioned by the ABC, premiered at Sydney Town Hall on 23 February 1974 by the Sydney Symphony Orchestra, conducted by John Hopkins
In Thanksgiving – Sir Bernard Heinze (1982), for orchestra; in memory of Australian conductor and musician Bernard Heinze. Premiered by the Sydney Symphony Orchestra, conducted by Patrick Thomas, on 23 August 1982 at the Sydney Opera House.
Symphony No. 6 – A Liturgy of Homage to the Australian Broadcasting Commission in its Fiftieth Year as University to the Australian Nation (1982), for orchestra; a massive 45-minute score for a huge orchestra including quadruple woodwinds, a large percussion section and organ, the work is divided up into fourteen sections. Commissioned by the ABC, premiered by all seven of the ABC orchestras (Adelaide Symphony Orchestra, Melbourne Symphony Orchestra, Queensland Symphony Orchestra, Sydney Symphony Orchestra, Tasmanian Symphony Orchestra, West Australian Symphony Orchestra and Darwin Symphony Orchestra), linked electronically
Symphony No. 7 – Symphony for Strings (1984), for string orchestra; commissioned to mark the 150th Anniversary of the State of Victoria. Premiered by the Chamber Strings of Melbourne, conducted by Christopher Martin, on 12 August 1985.
Lento for Strings (1985), for string orchestra; in memory of Australian violinist and conductor, Paul McDermott. Premiered in 1985 by the Philharmonia of Melbourne
The Dawn Is at Hand (1988), for SATB choir and orchestra; a five-movement choral symphony to poems by Aboriginal poet Kath Walker. Commissioned by the Australian Bicentennial Authority, and premiered by the Queensland Symphony Orchestra and Chorus in Brisbane, 1989. The movements are:
 "The Dawn Is At Hand" – "Aboriginal Charter of  Rights"
 "The Curlew Cried" – "Dawn Wail for the Dead"
 "Assimilation – No!"
 "We Are Going"
 "United We Win" – "A Song of Hope"
Bicentennial Anthem (1988), for orchestra; commissioned to mark the 200th Anniversary of European settlement of Australia
The True Endeavour (1988), for speaker, SATB choir and orchestra; symphonic statement with a text by Australian historian Manning Clark. Commissioned by the Australian Bicentennial Authority, premiered in 1989. The work is divided in seven movements:
 "The Southern Cross above Gondwana"
 "Aboriginal Australia"
 "Barcarolle of the Disinherited Country"
 "The Rainforest: Urban Despoliation"
 "Threnody for Murdered Aborigines"
 "The Past and the Challenge"
 Mateship: Whitlam's Vision: Makarrata"
Requiem for a Tribe Brother (1992), for a cappella SATB choir; commissioned by Peter Broadbent and the Joyful Company of Singers, this work was written in memory of one of Williamson's Aboriginal friends who died young from AIDS.
String Quartet No. 3 (1993); a one-movement string quartet, lasting approximately 10 minutes. Written for the Australian String Quartet, and premiered by them in Birmingham on 19 February 1994.

References

Further reading
Barkl, Michael. 2006. “Malcolm Williamson.”  The Oxford Dictionary of National Biography (ed Lawrence Goldman).  Oxford:  OUP.  https://www.oxforddnb.com/view/10.1093/ref:odnb/9780198614128.001.0001/odnb-9780198614128-e-89839

External links

A 70th birthday tribute by Paul Conway
To be a Pilgrim – Malcolm Williamson at 70
Malcolm Williamson interview, October 18, 1996
Malcolm Williamson and Rooks Nest House
 

1931 births
2003 deaths
20th-century classical composers
20th-century classical pianists
20th-century organists
20th-century Australian musicians
20th-century Australian male musicians
Australian male classical composers
Australian film score composers
Australian opera composers
Australian classical organists
Australian classical pianists
Ballet composers
Male classical pianists
Male opera composers
British male film score composers
Male classical organists
Commanders of the Order of the British Empire
Honorary Officers of the Order of Australia
Masters of the Queen's Music
Sydney Conservatorium of Music alumni
Bisexual men
Bisexual composers
Australian LGBT musicians
Australian emigrants to England
Converts to Roman Catholicism from Anglicanism
20th-century LGBT people